The Nathaniel and Isaac Kuykendall House is a historic house in rural Hampshire County, West Virginia, near the city of Romney.  It is a two-story stone structure, built in 1789 and enlarged in 1826.  The builders, Nathaniel Kuykendall and his son Isaac, were migrants of Dutch origin from New York, and the house they built is architecturally unusual for its Dutch-influenced Federal and Greek Revival architecture, and for its use of stone, at a time when most houses in the area were of log constructions.

It was listed on the National Register of Historic Places in 2014.

References

Houses on the National Register of Historic Places in West Virginia
Greek Revival houses in West Virginia
Houses completed in 1826
Houses in Hampshire County, West Virginia
National Register of Historic Places in Hampshire County, West Virginia
1826 establishments in Virginia
Federal architecture in West Virginia
Dutch-American culture in West Virginia
1789 establishments in Virginia
Houses completed in 1789